The 2016 United States Senate election in Missouri was held on November 8, 2016, to elect a member of the United States Senate to represent the State of Missouri. It was held concurrently with the 2016 U.S. presidential election, as well as other elections to the United States Senate in other states, elections to the United States House of Representatives, and various state and local elections. The primaries were held on August 2.

Incumbent Republican Senator Roy Blunt won re-election to a second term in office, defeating Democratic Missouri Secretary of State Jason Kander. Despite losing, Kander's margin of defeat was 15.7 percentage points closer than that of Democratic presidential nominee Hillary Clinton in the concurrent presidential election in the state.

Republican primary 
Despite being considered an "establishment" Republican, Blunt did not face serious Tea Party opposition due to his efforts to cultivate relationships with activists in Missouri, his effectiveness at "threading the needle" by keeping conservative and establishment Republicans fairly satisfied, and the open gubernatorial election, which attracted the most attention from Republicans.

Candidates

Declared 
 Roy Blunt, incumbent Senator since 2011
 Ryan Luethy, financial services worker
 Bernie Mowinski, retired army sergeant and perennial candidate
 Kristi Nichols, sales manager, Tea Party activist and candidate for the U.S. Senate in 2010

Withdrew 
 Christopher Batsche, businessman (running for MO-07)

Declined 
 Todd Akin, former U.S. Representative from 2001 to 2013 and nominee for the U.S. Senate in 2012
 John Brunner, businessman and candidate for the U.S. Senate in 2012 (running for Governor)
 John Lamping, former State Senator

Endorsements

Polling

Results

Democratic primary

Candidates

Declared 
 Cori Bush, pastor, nurse and co-director of the Truth Telling Project
 Jason Kander, Secretary of State of Missouri since 2013
 Robert Mack, military veteran
 Chief Wana Dubie, marijuana activist

Declined 
 Jay Nixon, Governor of Missouri since 2009
 Mike Sanders, Jackson County Executive, former Jackson County Prosecuting Attorney and former Chairman of the Missouri Democratic Party
 Clint Zweifel, State Treasurer of Missouri since 2009

Endorsements

Polling

Results

Third party and independent candidates

Libertarian primary

Candidates

Declared 
 Jonathan Dine, nominee for the U.S. Senate in 2010 and 2012
 Herschel Young

Results

Constitution primary

Candidates

Declared 
 Fred Ryman

Results

Green Party

Candidates

Declared 
 Johnathan McFarland

Write-in 
 Gina Bufe
 Patrick Lee

General election

Debates

Predictions

Polling

Results

See also 
 United States Senate elections, 2016

References

External links 
Official campaign websites
 Roy Blunt (R) for Senate
 Jason Kander (D) for Senate
 Fred Ryman (C) for Senate

2016
Missouri
United States Senate
Jason Kander